Tereza Petržilková (born 10 September 1993) is a Czech athlete. She competed in the mixed 4 × 400 metres relay event at the 2019 World Athletics Championships.

References

External links
 

1993 births
Living people
Czech female sprinters
World Athletics Championships athletes for the Czech Republic
People from Strakonice